The states parties to the Rome Statute of the International Criminal Court are those sovereign states that have ratified, or have otherwise become party to, the Rome Statute of the International Criminal Court. The Rome Statute is the treaty that established the International Criminal Court, an international court that has jurisdiction over certain international crimes, including genocide, crimes against humanity, and war crimes that are committed by nationals of states parties or within the territory of states parties. States parties are legally obligated to co-operate with the Court when it requires, such as in arresting and transferring indicted persons or providing access to evidence and witnesses. States parties are entitled to participate and vote in proceedings of the Assembly of States Parties, which is the Court's governing body. Such proceedings include the election of such officials as judges and the Prosecutor, the approval of the Court's budget, and the adoption of amendments to the Rome Statute.

States parties 
As of October 2022, 123 states have ratified or acceded to the Rome Statute— these include 33 African, 19 Asia-Pacific, 18 Eastern Europe, 28 Latin American and Caribbean, and 25 from Western European and other States.

Withdrawal
Article 127 of the Rome Statute allows for states to withdraw from the ICC.  Withdrawal takes effect one year after notification of the depositary, and has no effect on prosecution that has already started. As of March 2018 four states have given formal notice of their intention to withdraw from the statute, although two rescinded before it came into effect.

Several states have argued that the ICC is a tool of Western imperialism, only punishing leaders from small, weak states while ignoring crimes committed by richer and more powerful states. This sentiment has been expressed particularly by African states, 34 of which are members of the ICC, due to a perceived disproportionate focus of the Court on Africa. Nine out of the ten situations which the ICC has investigated were in African countries.

In June 2009, several African states, including Comoros, Djibouti, and Senegal, called on African states parties to withdraw en masse from the statute in protest against the indictment of Sudanese President Omar al-Bashir. In September 2013, Kenya's National Assembly passed a motion to withdraw from the ICC in protest against the ICC prosecution of Kenyan Deputy President William Ruto and President Uhuru Kenyatta (both charged before coming into office). A mass withdrawal from the ICC by African member states in response to the trial of Kenyan authorities was discussed at a special summit of the African Union in October.  The summit concluded that serving heads of state should not be put on trial, and that the Kenyan cases should be deferred. However, the summit did not endorse the proposal for a mass withdrawal due to lack of support for the idea. In November the ICC's Assembly of State Parties responded by agreeing to consider proposed amendments to the Rome Statute to address the AU's concerns.

In October–November 2016, Burundi, South Africa, and The Gambia all notified the UNSG of their intention to withdraw from the ICC.  Burundi was the subject of an ongoing preliminary investigation by the ICC at the time. South Africa's exit followed its refusal to execute an ICC warrant for Sudan's al-Bashir when he was in the country. Following The Gambia's presidential election later that year, which ended the long rule of Yahya Jammeh, The Gambia rescinded its withdrawal notification. The constitutionality of South Africa's notice was challenged by the Democratic Alliance opposition party, which argued that the approval of parliament was required and not sought. The High Court of South Africa ruled in February 2017 that the government's notification was not legal, and it was required to revoke the notice effective 7 March 2017. A parliamentary bill on ICC withdrawal was subsequently withdrawn by the government. However, the governing African National Congress party still supports withdrawing, and in 2019 a new bill was put before Parliament to withdraw from the Statute, though this was eventually withdrawn in March 2023.

On March 14, 2018, Rodrigo Duterte, the Philippine President who is under preliminary examination by the ICC for his controversial war on drugs campaign, announced that the country would withdraw from the Rome Statute. He argued that while the Statute was ratified by the Senate of the Philippines in 2011, it was never published in the Official Gazette of the Philippines, a requirement for penal laws (of which the Rome Statute subscribes as such) to take effect.  Hence, he claimed that the Philippines was never a State Party ab initio.  Additionally, he stated that the ICC was being utilized as a political tool against weak targets such as the Philippines.  The United Nations received the official notification of withdrawal on March 17, 2018; one year later (March 17, 2019), by rule, the Philippines' withdrawal became official.  The legal validity of the withdrawal was challenged at the Supreme Court of the Philippines, was dismissed in a unanimous decision for being "moot and academic" 2 years after the country's official withdrawal from the tribunal. Bongbong Marcos, Duterte's successor as President, has stated that the country "has no intention of rejoining the ICC".

Implementing legislation
The Rome Statute obliges states parties to cooperate with the Court in the investigation and prosecution of crimes, including the arrest and surrender of suspects.  Part 9 of the Statute requires all states parties to “ensure that there are procedures available under their national law for all of the forms of cooperation which are specified under this Part”.

Under the Rome Statute's complementarity principle, the Court only has jurisdiction over cases where the relevant state is unwilling or unable to investigate and, if appropriate, prosecute the case itself. Therefore, many states parties have implemented national legislation to provide for the investigation and prosecution of crimes that fall under the jurisdiction of the Court.

As of April 2006, the following states had enacted or drafted implementing legislation:

Summary of signatures and ratifications/accessions

Allocation of judges
The number of states parties from the several United Nations regional groups has an influence on the minimum number of judges each group is allocated. Paragraph 20(b) of the Procedure for the nomination and election of judges of the Court states that any of the five regional groups shall have at least two judges on the court. If, however, a group has more than 16 states parties, there is a third judge allocated to that group.

The following table lists how many states parties there are from each regional group. After the accession of the Maldives on 1 December 2011, the Asian Group has become the last regional group to have three judges allocated. This already had consequences for the 2011 judges election.

Acceptance of jurisdiction
Pursuant to article 12(3) of the Rome Statute of the International Criminal Court, a state that is not a party to the Statute may, "by declaration lodged with the Registrar, accept the exercise of jurisdiction by the Court with respect to the crime in question." Even if the state that does so is not a State Party to the Statute, the relevant provisions of the statute would still be applicable on the accepting state, but only on an ad hoc basis.

To date, the Court has made public five article 12(3) declarations.  Additionally, a declaration was submitted in December 2013 by the Freedom and Justice Party of Egypt seeking to accept jurisdiction on behalf of Egypt.  However, the Office of the Prosecutor found that as the party has lost power following the 2013 Egyptian coup d'état that July, it did not have the authority to make the declaration.

Signatories which have not ratified
Of the 139 states that had signed the Rome Statute, 31 have not ratified.

According to the Vienna Convention on the Law of Treaties, a state that has signed but not ratified a treaty is obliged to refrain from "acts which would defeat the object and purpose" of the treaty.  However, these obligations do not continue if the state has "made its intention clear not to become a party to the treaty".  Four signatory states (Israel, Russia, Sudan, and the United States) have informed the UN Secretary General that they no longer intend to become parties to the Rome Statute, and as such have no legal obligations arising from their signature.

Armenia
In 2004, the Constitutional Court of Armenia ruled that the Statute was not compatible due to constitutional requirements on sovereignty over the judicial system.

On 29 December 2022, the government of Armenia announced it was beginning the process of ratifying the Rome Statute, which it signed in 1999.  A request has been made for the constitutional court to review whether the current Constitution of Armenia (which has been amended twice since the question was last reviewed) allows for the country to join the ICC.

According to Justice Minister Grigor Minasyan, Armenia would declare that the Rome Statute would apply to Armenia retroactively from 12 May 2021, when a border crisis with Azerbaijan began, in the hopes of filing proceedings against the latter for alleged war crimes.

Bahrain
The government of Bahrain originally announced in May 2006 that it would ratify the Rome Statute in the session ending in July 2006. By December 2006, the ratification had not yet been completed, but the Coalition for the International Criminal Court said they expected ratification in 2007.

Israel
Israel voted against the adoption of the Rome Statute but later signed it for a short period.  In 2002, Israel notified the UN Secretary General that it no longer intended to become a party to the Rome Statute, and as such, it has no legal obligations arising from their signature of the statute.

Israel states that it has "deep sympathy" with the goals of the Court. However, it has concerns that political pressure on the Court would lead it to reinterpret international law or to "invent new crimes". It cites the inclusion of "the transfer of parts of the civilian population of an occupying power into occupied territory" as a war crime as an example of this, whilst at the same time disagrees with the exclusion of terrorism and drug trafficking. Israel sees the powers given to the prosecutor as excessive and the geographical appointment of judges as disadvantaging Israel which was prevented from joining any of the UN Regional Groups.

Kuwait
At a conference in 2007, the Kuwaiti Bar Association and the Secretary of the National Assembly of Kuwait, Hussein Al-Hereti, called for Kuwait to join the Court.

Russia
Russia signed the Rome Statute in 2000.  On 14 November 2016 the ICC published a report on its preliminary investigation of the Russian military intervention in Ukraine which found that "the situation within the territory of Crimea and Sevastopol factually amounts to an on-going state of occupation" and that "information, such as reported shelling by both States of military positions of the other, and the detention of Russian military personnel by Ukraine, and vice-versa, points to direct military engagement between Russian armed forces and Ukrainian government forces that would suggest the existence of an international armed conflict in the context of armed hostilities in eastern Ukraine".  In response, a presidential decree by Russian President Vladimir Putin approved "sending the Secretary General of the United Nations notice of the intention of the Russian Federation to no longer be a party to the Rome Statute".  Formal notice was given on 30 November 2016.

Sudan
Sudan signed the Rome Statute in 2000. In 2005 the ICC opened an investigation into the war in Darfur, a region of Sudan.  Omar al-Bashir, the President of Sudan, was indicted in 2009.
On 26 August 2008, Sudan notified the UN Secretary General that it no longer intended to ratify the treaty and therefore no longer bears any legal obligations arising from its signature.  Following the 2019 Sudanese coup d'état, Sadiq al-Mahdi a former Prime Minister of Sudan who backs the opposition, called for Sudan to join the ICC.

On 4 August 2021, the Sudanese government approved unanimously a draft bill to join the Rome Statute of the International Criminal Court.

Thailand
Former Senator Kraisak Choonhavan called in November 2006 for Thailand to ratify the Rome Statute and to accept retrospective jurisdiction, so that former premier Thaksin Shinawatra could be investigated for crimes against humanity connected to 2,500 alleged extrajudicial killings carried out in 2003 against suspected drug dealers.

Ukraine
A 2001 ruling of the Constitutional Court of Ukraine held that the Rome Statute is inconsistent with the Constitution of Ukraine. Notwithstanding, in October 2006, the Ambassador to the United Nations stated that the Ukrainian government would submit a bill to the parliament to ratify the Statute. Ukraine ratified Agreement on the Privileges and Immunities of the Court (APIC) without having ratified the Rome Statute on 2007-01-29. On 4 April 2012, the Foreign Minister of Ukraine told the President of the International Criminal Court that "Ukraine intends to join the Rome Statute once the necessary legal preconditions have been created in the context of the upcoming review of the country’s constitution."  A bill to make the necessary constitutional amendments was tabled in Parliament in May 2014.  Article 8 of the Ukraine–European Union Association Agreement, which was signed in 2014, requires Ukraine to ratify the Rome Statute.  In 2016 the Ukrainian parliament adopted the necessary constitutional amendments to allow for ratification of the Rome Statute, however they will not enter into force for three years.  Following his election as president, Volodymyr Zelenskyy's administration pledged in 2019 that ratifying the Rome Statute was a priority.

United States

The United States signed the Rome Statute in December 2000 (under President Bill Clinton), but Clinton decided not to submit the treaty to the United States Senate for ratification, stating: "I will not, and do not recommend that my successor [George W. Bush] submit the treaty to the Senate for advice and consent until our fundamental concerns are satisfied." Opponents of the ICC in the U.S. Senate are "skeptical of new international institutions and still jealously protective of American sovereignty"; before the Rome Statute, opposition to the ICC was largely headed by Republican Senator Jesse Helms. On May 6, 2002, the Bush administration stated that the U.S. did not intend to become a state party to the ICC; in a letter to Secretary-General of the United Nations Kofi Annan, Under Secretary of State for Arms Control and International Security John Bolton stated that "the United States does not intend to become a party to the treaty," and that "the United States has no legal obligations arising from its signature on December 31, 2000." This letter is sometimes called the "unsigning" of the treaty; however, legal opinions on the actual legal effect of the letter differ, with some scholars arguing that the president does not have the power to unilaterally "unsign" treaties.

The United States "adopted a hostile stance towards the Court throughout most of the Bush presidency." In 2002, Congress enacted the American Servicemembers' Protection Act (ASPA), which was signed into law on  August 2, 2002; the "overriding purpose of the ASPA was to inhibit the U.S. government from supporting the ICC." Major provisions of the ASPA blocked U.S. funding of the ICC and required the U.S. "to enter into agreements with all ICC signatory states to shield American citizens abroad from ICC jurisdiction, under the auspices of Article 98 of the Rome Statute," which bars the ICC "from prosecuting individuals located on the territory of an ICC member state, where such action by the Court would cause the member state to violate the terms of any other bilateral or multilateral treaty to which it is a party." Traditionally, Article 98 was used in relation to traditional status of forces agreements (SOFAs) and status of mission agreements (SOMAs), in which nations hosting U.S. military personnel by invitation agreed to immunize them from prosecution in foreign courts.  The Bush administration, supported by opponents of the ICC in Congress, adopted a new strategy of aggressively pursuing Bilateral Immunity Agreements (BIAs), "which guarantee immunity from ICC prosecution for all American citizens in the country with which the agreement is concluded" rather than just U.S. military forces.  "Under the original ASPA, nations who refused to conclude BIAs with the United States were subject to sanctions, including the loss of military aid (though these provisions have since been repealed)."  As of December 2006, the U.S. State Department reported that it had signed 102 BIAs. In 2002, the United States threatened to veto the renewal of all United Nations peacekeeping missions unless its troops were granted immunity from prosecution by the Court. In a compromise move, the Security Council passed Resolution 1422 on 12 July 2002, granting immunity to personnel from ICC non-states parties involved in United Nations established or authorized missions for a renewable twelve-month period. This was renewed for twelve months in 2003 but the Security Council refused to renew the exemption again in 2004, after pictures emerged of US troops abusing Iraqi prisoners in Abu Ghraib, and the US withdrew its demand.

Under the Obama administration, the U.S. did not take moves to ratify the Rome Statute, but did adopt a "cautious, case-by-case approach to supporting the ICC" by supporting cases before the ICC. Secretary of State Hillary Clinton stated that the U.S. encouraged "effective ICC action in ways that promote U.S. interests by bringing war criminals to justice." U.S. steps in support of the ICC undertaken under the Obama administration included participating in the annual Assembly of States Parties as an observer; using the U.S.'s permanent seat on the UN Security Council to support the referral of cases to the ICC (including Libya in 2011); "sharing intelligence on fugitives and providing other substantial in-kind support" to the ICC; and expanding the War Crimes Rewards Program."

The Trump administration strained relations with the ICC, stating it would revoke visas for any ICC staff seeking to investigate Americans for war crimes. Secretary of State Mike Pompeo stated that such revocations could be applied to any staff involved with investigating war crimes committed by Israel or other allied nations as well.

Yemen
On 24 March 2007, the Yemeni parliament voted to ratify the Rome Statute.  However, some MPs claim that this vote breached parliamentary rules, and demanded another vote. In that further vote, the ratification was retracted.

Non-party, non-signatory states 
The deadline for signing the Rome Statute expired following 31 December 2000. States that did not sign before that date have to accede to the Statute in a single step.

Of all the states that are members of the United Nations, observers in the United Nations General Assembly, or otherwise recognized by the Secretary-General of the United Nations as states with full treaty-making capacities, there are 41 which have neither signed nor acceded to the Statute:

 
 
 
 
 
 
 
 
 
 
 
 
 
 
 
 
 
 
 
 
 
 
 
 
 
 
 
 
 
 
 
 
 
 
 
 
 
 
 
 
 

Additionally, in accordance with practice and declarations filed with the Secretary-General, the Rome Statute is not in force in the following dependent territories:

  – a Crown dependency of the United Kingdom
  – a Crown dependency of the United Kingdom
  – a territory of New Zealand

China
The People's Republic of China has opposed the Court, on the basis that it goes against the sovereignty of nation states, that the principle of complementarity gives the Court the ability to judge a nation's court system, that war crimes jurisdiction covers internal as well as international conflicts, that the Court's jurisdiction covers peacetime crimes against humanity, that the inclusion of the crime of aggression weakens the role of the UN Security Council, and that the Prosecutor's right to initiate prosecutions may open the Court to political influence.

India
The government of India has consistently opposed the Court. It abstained in the vote adopting the statute in 1998, saying it objected to the broad definition adopted of crimes against humanity; the rights given to the UN Security Council to refer and delay investigations and bind non-states parties; and the use of nuclear weapons and other weapons of mass destruction not being explicitly criminalized. Other anxieties about the Court concern how the principle of complementarity would be applied to the Indian criminal justice system, the inclusion of war crimes for non-international conflicts, and the power of the Prosecutor to initiate prosecutions.

Indonesia
Indonesia has stated that it supports the adoption of the Rome Statute, and that “universal participation should be the cornerstone of the International Criminal Court”.  In 2004, the President of Indonesia adopted a National Plan of Action on Human Rights, which states that Indonesia intends to ratify the Rome Statute in 2008. This was confirmed in 2007 by Foreign Minister Hassan Wirajuda and the head of the Indonesian People's Representative Council's Committee on Security and International Affairs, Theo L. Sambuaga.  In May 2013, Defense Minister Purnomo Yusgiantoro stated that the government needed "more time to carefully and thoroughly review the pros and cons of the ratification".

Iraq
In February 2005, the Iraqi Transitional Government decided to ratify the Rome Statute. However, two weeks later they reversed this decision, a move that the Coalition for the International Criminal Court claimed was due to pressure from the United States.

Lebanon
In March 2009, Lebanese Justice Minister said the government had decided not to join for now. The Coalition for the International Criminal Court claimed this was due in part to "intense pressure" from the United States, who feared it could result in the prosecution of Israelis in a future conflict.

Malaysia
Malaysia submitted an instrument of accession to the Rome Statute on 4 March 2019, which was to enter into force on 1 June.  However, on 29 April 2019, Malaysia submitted a notice withdrawing its instrument of accession effective immediately to the Secretary General of the United Nations, preventing it from acceding.  Prime Minister Mahathir Mohamad explained that the withdrawal was due to concerns over its constitutionality as well as possible infringement of the sovereignty of the Malay Rulers.

Nepal
On 25 July 2006, the Nepalese House of Representatives directed the government to ratify the Rome
Statute. Under Nepalese law, this motion is compulsory for the Executive.

Following a resolution by Parliament requesting that the government ratify the Statute, Narahari Acharya, Ministry of Law, Justice, Constituent Assembly and Parliamentary Affairs of Nepal, said in March 2015 that it had "formed a taskforce to conduct a study about the process".  However, he said that it was "possible only after promulgating the new constitution", which was being debated by the 2nd Nepalese Constituent Assembly.

Pakistan
Pakistan has supported the aims of the International Court and voted for the Rome Statute in 1998. However, Pakistan has not signed the agreement on the basis of several objections, including the fact that the Statute does not provide for reservations upon ratification or accession, the inclusion of provisional arrest, and the lack of immunity for heads of state. In addition, Pakistan (one of the largest suppliers of UN peacekeepers) has, like the United States, expressed reservations about the potential use of politically motivated charges against peacekeepers.

South Sudan
South Sudan's President Salva Kiir Mayardit said in 2013 that the country would not join the ICC.

Turkey
Turkey is currently a candidate country to join the European Union, which has required progress on human rights issues in order to continue with accession talks. Part of this has included pressure, but not a requirement, on Turkey to join the Court which is supported under the EU's Common Foreign and Security Policy. Prime Minister Recep Tayyip Erdoğan stated in October 2004 that Turkey would "soon" ratify the Rome Statute, and the Turkish constitution was amended in 2004 to explicitly allow nationals to be surrendered to the Court. However, in January 2008, the Erdoğan government reversed its position, deciding to shelve accession because of concerns it could undermine efforts against the Kurdistan Workers Party.

See also
List of Presidents and Vice-Presidents of the Assembly of States Parties of the International Criminal Court
European Union and the International Criminal Court

Notes

References

Rome Statute, States Parties
Lists of parties to treaties
Rome Statute of the International Criminal Court

fr:Cour pénale internationale#États membres